Emma Lou Warner Thayne (October 22, 1924 – December 6, 2014) was a poet and novelist. She was a member of the Church of Jesus Christ of Latter-day Saints and counted as one of the 75 most significant Mormon poets.

Thayne graduated from the University of Utah in 1945. She would later return there to coach tennis and teach English. In the late 1960s, she completed a master's degree at the University of Utah. She was on the faculty over 30 years. In 1949, she married Mel Thayne; they became the parents of five daughters.

Although Thayne worked primarily as a poet, she also wrote novels. Her first novel was Never Past the Gate, which was inspired by her summers growing up in Mount Aire Canyon. Thayne also served on the board of directors for Deseret News. She was also a contributor to such magazines as Network, a woman's magazine based in Salt Lake City, Exponent II and Utah Holiday. At age 90, she died in Salt Lake City on December 6, 2014.

Thayne wrote the words to the hymn "Where Can I Turn for Peace".

Awards
Distinguished Alumna, University of Utah
David O. McKay Humanities Award, Brigham Young University
Chamber of Commerce Honors in the Arts Award
Gandhi Peace Award, 2013 

Salt Lake Community college named the Emma Lou Thayne Center for Service Learning after Thayne to honor her.

Works 
Spaces in the Sage (1971) — poetry collection
On Slim Unaccountable Bones: Poems (1974) — novel
Never Past the Gate (1975) — novel
With Love, Mother (1975) — poetry collection
A Woman's Place (1977) — novel
Until Another Day for Butterflies (1978) — poetry collection
Once In Israel (1980) — poetry collection
How Much for the Earth? A Suite of Poems: About Time for Considering (1983) — poetry collection
"Where Can I Turn For Peace?" (1985) hymn
Things Happen: Poems of Survival (1991) — poetry collection
Hope and Recovery: A Mother-Daughter Story About Anorexis Nervosa, Bulimia, and Manic Depression (1992)
Clarice Short: Earthy Academic (1994) — biography/memoir
All God's Critters Got A Place in the Choir (1995) — personal essay collection with Laurel Thatcher Ulrich
"The Place of Knowing" (2011) — personal memoir/autobiography

References

Further reading

 
 
  — Describes Thayne winning the 2011 Utah Governor's Mansion Artist Award

External links

1924 births
2014 deaths
20th-century American novelists
20th-century American poets
20th-century American women writers
American Latter Day Saint hymnwriters
American Latter Day Saint writers
American women novelists
American women poets
Latter Day Saint poets
Writers from Salt Lake City
Poets from Utah
University of Utah alumni
University of Utah faculty
Mormon memoirists
American women hymnwriters
Novelists from Utah
Latter Day Saints from Utah
American women non-fiction writers
20th-century American non-fiction writers
Women memoirists
American women academics
21st-century American women